Wonji-dong is a dong, neighbourhood of Seocho-gu in Seoul, South Korea. It is a legal dong (법정동 ) administered under its administrative dong (행정동 ), Yangjae 2-dong.

See also 
Yeomgokcheon (염곡천 廉谷川)
Administrative divisions of South Korea

References

External links
Seocho-gu official website
Seocho-gu map at the Seocho-gu official website
 The Yangjae 2-dong Resident office

Neighbourhoods of Seocho District